Leptocoma is a genus of sunbirds found from tropical South Asia to Papua New Guinea. Its members are sometimes included in Nectarinia.

The sunbirds are a group of very small Old World passerine birds which feed largely on nectar, although they will also take insects, especially when feeding young. Flight is fast and direct on their short wings. Most species can take nectar by hovering like a hummingbird, but usually perch to feed.

Taxonomy
The genus was introduced by the German ornithologist Jean Cabanis in 1850 with Van Hasselt's sunbird as the type species. The name Leptocoma combines the Ancient Greek words leptos "delicate" or "fine" and komē "hair".

Its six members are:

References

 
Bird genera